The Old Dominion glass factory operated from 1901–1925 in Alexandria, Virginia.  The company specialized in beer, medicine, and soda bottles, as well as novelty items.  Both black and white workers were employed in the factory, but there is little information on whether they worked side by side.

In 1911, Lewis Hine photographed some of the child workers in the factory for his exposé of child labor. The factory was later destroyed by fire in 1925.  The property can be found at North Fairfax and Montgomery streets.

References
Old Dominion Glass Company  - Virginia African Heritage Program

External links
Information on the Old Dominion Glass Company from Virginia African Heritage Program

Glassmaking companies of the United States
Defunct glassmaking companies
History of Alexandria, Virginia
Manufacturing companies established in 1901
Manufacturing companies disestablished in 1925
1850 establishments in Virginia
2001 disestablishments in Virginia
Defunct manufacturing companies based in Virginia